Knights for a Day is a 1937 British comedy film directed by Norman Lee and starring Nelson Keys, John Garrick and Nancy Burne. It was made as a quota quickie at Welwyn Studios.

Plot
A man wins a car in a competition, and decides to tour round the country. He ends up assisting a prince who is being pursued by a gang of revolutionaries.

Cast
 Nelson Keys as Bert Wrigley 
 John Garrick as Prince Nicholas of Datria  
 Nancy Burne as Sally Wrigley  
 Frank Atkinson as Timothy Trout  
 Cathleen Nesbitt as Lady Agatha  
 Billy Bray as Brandt  
 Fred Duprez as Custer  
 Gerald Barry as Krampf  
 Wyn Weaver as Lord Croke 
 Percy Walsh as Lord Southdown

References

Bibliography
Chibnall, Steve. Quota Quickies: The Birth of the British 'B' Film. British Film Institute, 2007.
Low, Rachael. Filmmaking in 1930s Britain. George Allen & Unwin, 1985.
Wood, Linda. British Films, 1927–1939. British Film Institute, 1986.

External links

1937 films
British comedy films
British black-and-white films
1937 comedy films
1930s English-language films
Films directed by Norman Lee
Films shot at Welwyn Studios
1930s British films